Leniel Charlie Hooker (June 28, 1919 – December 18, 1977) was an American pitcher in Negro league baseball. He played from 1940 to 1951.

References

External links
 and Seamheads

1919 births
1977 deaths
Newark Eagles players
Philadelphia Stars players
Farnham Pirates players
Drummondville Cubs players
People from Sanford, North Carolina
20th-century African-American sportspeople